Lakelands is a 2022 Irish drama film by Robert Higgins and Patrick McGivney of Harp Media in their feature film debut.

Premise
The film centres on local small-town GAA football "outside the bright lights of Croke Park", following a player who struggles to get back into the sport after an injury.

Cast
 Éanna Hardwicke as Cian Reilly
 Danielle Galligan as Grace
 Lorcan Cranitch
 Dafhyd Flynn
 Dara Devaney
 Gary Lydon
 Trevor Kaneswaran as Dr Tom Mulvey

Production
Patrick O’Neill of Wildcard executive produced the film. Principal photography took place on location in Granard, County Longford in late 2021, wrapping at the end of November. The project received support from Creative Ireland, Longford Arts Office, Backstage Theatre, Longford LEO, and Screen Ireland as well as winning the Bankside Films Marketplace Award at the 2021 Galway Film Fleadh back in August.

Release
Wildcard is handling the distribution of the film in Ireland and the UK. It is expected to have a theatrical release. The film premiered the 2022 Galway Film Fleadh. It will have a U.S. screening at the 2023 Santa Barbara International Film Festival.

Awards and nominations

References

External links
 

Upcoming films
County Longford
Gaelic games films
Irish sports drama films